The year 1635 in music involved some significant events.

Events 
 Composer and poet Elisabeth Sophie of Mecklenburg marries Augustus the Younger, Duke of Brunswick-Wolfenbüttel.
 Composer John Wilson enters the King's Musick as a lutenist.

Classical music 
Giovanni Battista Abatessa – Cespuglio di varii fiori..., a collection of songs with alfabetto notation for the guitar, published in Orvieto
Girolamo Frescobaldi – Fiori musicali (Musical Flowers), a collection of organ music
Stefano Pasino – Masses for four voices, Op. 4 (Venice: Bartolomeo Magni)

Opera 
Virgilio Puccitelli (attr.) – Giuditta

Births 
June 3 – Philippe Quinault, dramatist and opera librettist (d. 1688)

Deaths 
June 14 – Christian Erbach, organist and composer (b. c. 1568)
October 10 – Johann Ulrich Steigleder, organist and composer (b. 1593)
date unknown
Manuel Rodrigues Coelho, organist and composer (born c.1555)

References

 
Music
17th century in music
Music by year